Alessandro Belleri (born 10 February 1985) is an Italian footballer who plays as a striker.

Club career
Belleri joined Avellino in 2005 in co-ownership deal. In August 2006 he left for Giugliano along with Gianluca Russo. In October 2007 he left for Solbiatese and in January 2008 for German side SV Wacker Burghausen. He spent  seasons in Germany. In 2010–11 season he returned to Italy for Serie D side Darfo Boario.

International career
Belleri capped for Italy under-20 Serie C team from 2004 to 2005, in Mirop Cup.

References

External links
 

1985 births
Living people
Italian footballers
U.S. Avellino 1912 players
SV Wacker Burghausen players
FC Oberneuland players
A.C. Montichiari players
Association football forwards
S.S.C. Giugliano players
Italian expatriates in Germany
A.S.D. SolbiaSommese Calcio players
Expatriate footballers in Germany
A.S. Gubbio 1910 players
3. Liga players
A.S.D. Fanfulla players